The Open Sud de France (formerly known as the Grand Prix de Tennis de Lyon) is a professional tennis tournament played on indoor hard courts. It is currently part of the ATP Tour 250 series of the ATP Tour. Founded in 1987, it was held annually in October at the Palais des Sports de Gerland in Lyon until 2009, before being relocated to Montpellier in 2010. The tournament takes place at the Montpellier Arena, holding 7,500 spectators. 

The tournament is one of four French events of the ATP Tour 250 series, along with the Open 13, the Moselle Open, and the Lyon Open. There was no event in 2011 as the tournament moved to a January slot in 2012.

Past finals

Singles

Doubles

See also
 Lyon Open

References

External links
  
 ATP tournament profile

 
Tennis tournaments in France
Indoor tennis tournaments
Hard court tennis tournaments
Recurring sporting events established in 1987
Sports competitions in Lyon
Sport in Montpellier
Grand Prix tennis circuit
1987 establishments in France